After the Farm is the second studio album by Rosie Flores. It was released by HighTone Records on March 18, 1992.

Musical style 

Kevin Ransom of Guitar Player called the record "a tough-minded three-guitar country-rock showcase that uses The Byrds and Buffalo Springfield as musical touchstones."

Critical reception

Chip Renner of AllMusic writes, "From start to finish, there is something special about this CD." He finishes his review with, "They rock, with some real killer slide-guitar work. If you like your country hard, you'll love it."

Robert Christgau gives the album an A− and says, "the catch in her voice has gotten so husky you want to give her a squeeze, and she writes more good songs about the usual thing than any of the young hunks who've given Nashville delusions of grandeur."

On this album, Musician reviewer Peter Cronin noted, "Flores is playing more guitar and writing better songs than on her ill-fated Warner Bros., debut. Most importantly, the singer sounds like she's having a blast."

Track listing

Track information and credits adapted the album's liner notes.

Musicians

Rosie Flores – Lead Vocals, Electric Guitar
Dusty Wakeman – Bass, Backing Vocals
Donald Lindley – Drums, Percussion
Duane Jarvis – Electric Guitar
Greg Leisz – Electric Guitar, Acoustic Guitar, Backing Vocals, Lap Steel Guitar
Jim Lauderdale – Harmony Vocals (track 10)

Production

Dusty Wakeman – Producer, Engineer, Recorded By, Mixed By
Greg Leisz – Producer
Michael Dumas – Engineer, Recorded By
Eddy Schreyer – Mastered By
Tom Green – Recording Assistant
Kathren Dettling – Hair
Constance Damron – Make-up
Mari Yoneda – Art Direction/Design
Susan Maljan – Photography/Art Direction

Dedication

This recording is dedicated to the memory of Stevie Ray Vaughan.

References

External links
Artist Official Site

1992 albums